The Diamond Man is a 1924 British crime film directed by Arthur Rooke and starring Arthur Wontner, Mary Odette and Reginald Fox. It was based on a novel by Edgar Wallace. The movie is silent and black and white. Distributed by Butcher's film service, script written by Eliot Stannard, and produced by I.B. Davidson Film Company.

Cast
 Arthur Wontner - Lacy Marshalt 
 Mary Odette - Audrey Torrington (Or Audrey Bedford) 
 Reginald Fox - Dick Shannon 
 Gertrude McCoy - Mrs. Marshalt 
 Philip Hewland - Henry Torrington 
 George Turner - Peter Tonger

Plot
The Diamond Man is about an orphan who takes the blame for her sister's crime, and later reveals her boss as her evil husband.

References

External links

1924 films
British silent feature films
1924 crime films
Films based on works by Edgar Wallace
Films directed by Arthur Rooke
British black-and-white films
British crime films
1920s English-language films
1920s British films
Butcher's Film Service films